Lucas Benjamin Ness is an English footballer who plays as a defender for  club Charlton Athletic.

Career

Charlton Athletic
Coming through the youth ranks at the Metropolitan Police, Ness joined Charlton Athletic having made nine first team appearances for the Metropolitan Police in 2019; seven of which were in the league and two further in the FA Cup.

Ness made his full first-team professional debut for Charlton on 30 September 2020 in a 1–1 EFL Trophy draw with Brighton & Hove Albion U21s.

Ness made his second appearance for the club, the following season, coming on as a second-half substitute – on 4 January 2022 – in a 1–0 win over Milton Keynes Dons in Round Three of the EFL Trophy.

Hampton & Richmond Borough (loan)
On 11 February 2022, Ness joined Hampton & Richmond Borough on a month's loan. On 18 March 2022, Ness's loan was extended until the end of the season.

Torquay United (loan)
On 29 October 2022, Ness joined Torquay United on a month's loan.

On 1 December 2022, it was confirmed that Ness had been recalled by Charlton having made eight first–team appearances for Torquay United.

Career statistics

References

External links
 

2000 births
Living people
English footballers
Association football defenders
Metropolitan Police F.C. players
Charlton Athletic F.C. players
Hampton & Richmond Borough F.C. players
Torquay United F.C. players